Rossens is a village in the Broye-Vully District in the canton of Vaud in Switzerland. Formerly an independent municipality, it lost that status on 1 July 2006 when, together with Sédeilles, it was merged into Villarzel.

References

Villages in the canton of Vaud
Former municipalities of the canton of Vaud